is a Prefectural Natural Park in Fukui Prefecture, Japan. Established in 1955, the park spans the municipalities of Ōno and Katsuyama.

See also
 National Parks of Japan
 Hakusan National Park

References

Parks and gardens in Fukui Prefecture
Protected areas established in 1955
1955 establishments in Japan